Hovhannes Tcholakian (12 April 1919 – 16 September 2016) was a Turkish-Armenian Archbishop of the Armenian Catholic Church.

Tcholakian was born in Istanbul and ordained a priest in Istanbul on 25 April 1943. He was elected archbishop on 23 May 1966 and consecrated on 16 January 1967. Between 1967 and 2015 he served as Archbishop of Istanbul. In March 2015 the Armenian Catholic Patriarch Nerses Bedros XIX Tarmouni accepted the resignation of Archbishop Tcholakian on grounds of age. He died in September 2016 at the age of 97.

References

External links
Catholic-Hierarchy

1919 births
2016 deaths
Armenian Catholic archbishops
Clergy from Istanbul
20th-century Eastern Catholic archbishops
Turkish people of Armenian descent
Eastern Catholic bishops in Turkey